All-interval may refer to:

All-interval hexachord
All-interval tetrachord
All-interval twelve-tone row